Cryphia postochrea is a moth of the family Noctuidae.

References

External links

Moths of Asia
Moths described in 1893
Bryophilinae